Pam Redfield (born 1948)  is a Nebraska state senator from Omaha, Nebraska in the Nebraska Legislature.  

Personal life
She was born Pam Turek on August 11, 1948, in Chicago, Illinois and graduated from Duchesne Academy in 1966.  She attended University of Nebraska-Lincoln and graduated from the University of Nebraska at Omaha in education in 1969.  She married Jerry Redfield and had six children.  She is the chair of the Rotary International Foundation, on the executive board of the National Conference of Insurance Legislators and a former member of the Ralston board of education.

State legislature
She was appointed on November 30, 1998 to replace Chris Abboud who had resigned.  She was then elected in 2002 to represent the 12th  Nebraska legislative district .  She currently is the vice chairperson of the Banking, Commerce and Insurance committee and sits on the Revenue committee. Since Nebraska voters passed Initiative Measure 415 in 2001 limiting state senators to two terms after 2001, she was unable to run for reelection in 2006.

External links
 
 

1948 births
Living people
Nebraska state senators
Politicians from Chicago
Politicians from Omaha, Nebraska
Women state legislators in Nebraska
21st-century American women